San Rafael National High School located in Tiagon, Camarines Sur, is a Filipino high school that offers complete four-year secondary courses. It was founded on September 16, 1986 by congressman Noli Fuentebella and Dr. Grigelda S. Pan.

SRNHS has been a pioneer in investigatory projects, which qualified it as the Philippine Science High School, Bicol Region Campus. The school has won national and international awards for investigatory activities. The school was once a representative of the Philippines in the investigatory project defense at Brunei and Singapore.

San Rafael National High School has three regulated curricula: the Special Program in the Arts (SPA), Science Technology and Engineering (STE), and the Revised Basic Education Curriculum (RBEC). The SPA has won two national championships in Dancing and Media Arts (Street Dancing Competition and Short Film Making).

The school has extracurricular activities, a newspaper (The Intersection), and a Majorette school.

References

High schools in Camarines Sur
Educational institutions established in 1986
1986 establishments in the Philippines